The Minnedosa Tribune, published in Minnedosa, Manitoba, Canada, is the oldest Western Canadian weekly.

See also
List of newspapers in Canada

External links

 

Weekly newspapers published in Manitoba
Publications with year of establishment missing